

Acts of the Northern Ireland Assembly

|-
| {{|Domestic Abuse and Civil Proceedings Act (Northern Ireland) 2021|ania|2|01-03-2021|maintained=y|archived=n|An Act to create a course of conduct offence and a sentencing aggravation concerning domestic abuse and make rules as to procedure and giving evidence in criminal cases involving domestic abuse; regulate the conduct of civil proceedings in particular circumstances; and make provision for connected purposes.}}
|-
| {{|Functioning of Government (Miscellaneous Provisions) Act (Northern Ireland) 2021|ania|3|22-03-2021|maintained=y|archived=n|An Act to amend sections 7 and 8 of the Civil Service (Special Advisers) Act (Northern Ireland) 2013, repeal the Civil Service Commissioners (Amendment) (Northern Ireland) Order in Council 2007, repeal the Civil Service Commissioners (Amendment) Order (Northern Ireland) 2016, amend sections 17 and 27 of the Assembly Members (Independent Financial Review and Standards) Act (Northern Ireland) 2011 and to make additional provision for the functioning of government in Northern Ireland and connected purposes.}}
|-
| {{|Budget Act (Northern Ireland) 2021|ania|4|23-03-2021|maintained=y|archived=n|An Act to authorise the issue out of the Consolidated Fund of certain sums for the service of the years ending 31 March 2021 and 2022; to appropriate those sums for specified purposes; to authorise the use for the public service of certain resources for those years; to revise the limits on the use of certain accruing resources in the year ending 31 March 2021; and to authorise the Department of Finance to borrow on the credit of the sum appropriated for the year ending 31 March 2022.}}
|-
| {{|Budget (No. 2) Act (Northern Ireland) 2021|ania|5|04-08-2021|maintained=y|archived=n|An Act to authorise the issue out of the Consolidated Fund of a certain sum for the service of the year ending 31 March 2022; to appropriate that sum for specified purposes; to authorise the Department of Finance to borrow on the credit of that sum; to authorise the use for the public service of certain resources (including accruing resources) for that year; and to repeal certain spent provisions.}}
|-
| {{|Pension Schemes Act (Northern Ireland) 2021|ania|6|09-08-2021|maintained=y|archived=n|An Act to make provision about pension schemes.}}
|-
| {{|Licensing and Registration of Clubs (Amendment) Act (Northern Ireland) 2021|ania|7|26-08-2021|maintained=y|archived=n|An Act to make provision about liquor licensing and the registration of clubs.}}
|-
| {{|Local Government (Meetings and Performance) Act (Northern Ireland) 2021|ania|8|26-08-2021|maintained=y|archived=n|An Act to make provision relating to requirements as to meetings and performance of district councils.}}
}}

References

2021